Damana Divisional Secretariat is a  Divisional Secretariat  of Ampara District, of Eastern Province, Sri Lanka.

References
 Divisional Secretariats Portal

Divisional Secretariats of Ampara District